Bon Voyage, Charlie Brown (and Don't Come Back!!) is a 1980 American animated adventure comedy film produced by United Feature Syndicate and distributed by Paramount Pictures, directed by Bill Melendez and Phil Roman. It was the fourth full-length feature film to be based on the Peanuts comic strip.

Peanuts creator Charles M. Schulz wrote that he came up with the idea for the story while visiting the Manoir de Malvoisine in Le Héron, where he was stationed briefly as a soldier during World War II. The castle plays a large role in the film.

Paramount Home Entertainment released this film on VHS and Laserdisc in 1995 in 4:3 format, and released it to DVD (cropped to widescreen) on October 6, 2015.

The film was also released on Blu-ray for the first time on March 15, 2022 in the US.

Plot
At Charlie Brown's school, Linus Van Pelt introduces to his class two French students, Babette and Jacques, who will be spending two weeks there in order to get accustomed to the United States. In exchange, Charlie Brown and Linus are chosen to go to France. Charlie Brown heads home and invites Snoopy and Woodstock to go with him. He gets a call from Peppermint Patty, who tells him that she and Marcie were also chosen to go to France as a student exchange. Charlie Brown also gets a letter from France, but cannot read it because it is written in French. He is not very positive about the trip because of the letter he got, but Marcie, who has been studying French, translates the letter, explaining that Charlie Brown has been invited to stay at a fictional French chateau, the Château du Mal Voisin (House of the Bad Neighbor). Charlie Brown cannot understand why someone in France would invite him to their home, let alone know who he is.

The group arrive first in London, where Snoopy leaves the group temporarily to play tennis at Wimbledon, where the beagle gets in a dispute with the referee for a judgment call about the ball being in or out. He loses his temper, causing him to be kicked out from the grounds. Snoopy later reunites with the group at Victoria Station where they take the train to Dover where they ride across the English Channel to France via hovercraft, they pick up a Citroën 2CV, which is driven by Snoopy (because the kids are too young to drive), although he grinds the gears out of it. Upon their arrival, the four go to their respective homes. Patty and Marcie go to stay at a farm in Morville-sur-Andelle, where they meet a boy named Pierre, who immediately attracts their attention. It is obvious that Marcie and Pierre have a spark between them – obvious to everyone except Patty, who manages to convince herself that Pierre likes her. Meanwhile, Charlie Brown, Linus, Snoopy, and Woodstock visit the chateau, which is actually owned by an unfriendly baron while his niece, Violette Honfleur, frequently leaves Charlie Brown and Linus food.

Linus enters the chateau's attic and learns from Violette that Charlie Brown's grandfather, Silas Brown, had served in the U.S. Army and helped them out during World War II. The baron returns home and Violette tries hiding Linus, but she inadvertently starts a fire in the chateau's attic. Charlie Brown runs to get Peppermint Patty and Marcie and Pierre calls the fire department while Snoopy and Woodstock get an old fashioned fire hose from a shed. Charlie Brown, Peppermint Patty, Marcie, and Pierre rescue Linus and Violette, and Snoopy uses the hose to keep the fire under control until the fire department arrives to help.

Thankful for the chateau's rescue, the baron has a change of heart and allows the gang inside, and Charlie Brown learns the truth behind the mysterious letter he received from Violette; one of the villagers toured the United States when he got a haircut from Charlie Brown's father, whereupon Violette was able to find Silas' grandson. Charlie Brown later wishes Violette and Pierre goodbye as he, Snoopy, Woodstock, Linus, Patty, and Marcie leave the chateau to see more of the French countryside, and eventually return home to the United States.

Cast
 Arrin Skelley as Charlie Brown
 Daniel Anderson as Linus van Pelt
 Patricia Patts as Peppermint Patty
 Casey Carlson as Marcie
 Annalisa Bortolin as Sally Brown
 Laura Planting as Lucy van Pelt
 Bill Melendez as Snoopy, Woodstock
 Pascale De Barolet as Pierre
 Roseline Rubens as Violette Honfleur, Violet, Patty, Frieda, Sophie
 Debbie Muller as Flight Attendant
 Scott Beach as Waiter, Baron, Driver, Tennis Announcer, English Voice, American Male
Schroeder, Pig-Pen, Babette, and Jacques appear but had no lines.

Reception

The film had a mostly positive reception.

See also
What Have We Learned, Charlie Brown?

 Peanuts filmography

References

External links

Peanuts films
1980 films
1980 animated films
1980s American films
1980s American animated films
1980s children's animated films
1980s English-language films
American children's animated adventure films
American children's animated comedy films
Animated films about children
Films directed by Bill Melendez
Films directed by Phil Roman
Films scored by Ed Bogas
Animated films set in London
Animated films set in Paris
Films with screenplays by Charles M. Schulz
Paramount Pictures animated films
Paramount Pictures films